Knight Island is a mostly-submerged island in the Napa River, upstream of San Pablo Bay (an embayment of San Francisco Bay). It is in Solano County, California, and managed as part of the Napa-Sonoma Marshes Wildlife Area.

References

Islands of Solano County, California
Islands of Northern California
San Pablo Bay